Asa Rashaan Webster Jackson (born December 2, 1989) is a former American football cornerback. He was drafted by the Baltimore Ravens in the fifth round of the 2012 NFL Draft. He played college football for California Polytechnic State University.

College career
Jackson was a four-year starter at California Polytechnic State University, San Luis Obispo, more commonly referred to as Cal Poly. He finished his college career with 137 solo tackles, 199 total tackles, 8 interceptions for 307 yards (ranks first in school history) and 3 touchdowns (ties school record with David Fullerton), 40 pass deflections, 3 forced fumbles, and a single sack for -6 yards. He played in 43 games, and started in 42 of them.

In July 2011, he was selected to the preseason Buck Buchanan Award Watch List, among 20 candidates for the Football Championship Subdivision's national Defensive Player of the Year honor, named by The Sports Network.

During a 48-14 win over South Dakota State in 2011, Jackson scored on a rare length-of-the-field interception return for a touchdown; although he intercepted the pass about 2 yards deep into his own end zone, NCAA statistics technically record the full return as 100 yards, which equaled the school's deepest return in 43 years.

Combined between punt and kickoff returns, Jackson also compiled 936 career return yards on special teams in college.

In the final voting for the Buchanan Award announced in January 2012, Jackson received 28 balloting points, including two first-place votes, as New Hampshire's Matt Evans won the award.

Professional career

Baltimore Ravens
In February 2012, Jackson was invited to the NFL Scouting Combine in Indianapolis, where he recorded the 12th-best shuttle time of any attendee (4.03 seconds) for any position in the class, and was timed at 4.48 seconds in the 40-yard dash.

Jackson was selected in the fifth round of the 2012 NFL Draft with the 169th overall pick. He is probably most known for returning a punt for a touchdown against the Atlanta Falcons during a preseason NFL game, and then started doing the famous Gangnam Style dance. Although, the play was nullified by a holding penalty. Jackson was placed on injured reserve on December 16, 2014. Jackson was cut by the Baltimore Ravens on September 5, 2015.

Suspension
Jackson was suspended for four games without pay for violating the NFL policy on performance-enhancing substances on December 11, 2012, for using Adderall, a prescription drug, to treat his attention-deficit hyperactivity disorder. On August 2, 2013, he again violated the PED policy and was suspended without pay for an additional eight games of the 2013 season. Jackson then completed the required paperwork to be authorized to take Adderall.

New York Giants
On September 6, 2015, the New York Giants claimed Jackson off Waivers. He was waived just two days after signing with the Giants.

Baltimore Ravens (second stint)
On September 10, 2015, Jackson was signed to the Ravens' practice squad.

On October 13, 2015, Jackson was re-signed to the active roster. He was waived/injured on November 17 due to an ankle injury. The next day, he was placed on the team's injured reserve and another day later, on November 19, 2015, he was waived from injured reserve.

Cincinnati Bengals
On November 30, 2015, Jackson was signed to the Bengals' practice squad.

Arizona Cardinals
On January 28, 2016, cornerback Asa Jackson signed a futures contract with the Arizona Cardinals. On August 29, 2016, Jackson was waived by the Cardinals.

Baltimore Ravens (third stint)
On October 17, 2016, Jackson was signed to the Ravens' practice squad. He was promoted to the active roster on November 15, 2016. He was released by the Ravens on November 26, 2016 and was re-signed to the practice squad.

Detroit Lions
On December 6, 2016, Jackson was signed by the Lions off the Ravens' practice squad. He was placed on injured reserve on January 3, 2017 with an ankle injury.

San Francisco 49ers
On August 8, 2017, Jackson was signed by the San Francisco 49ers. He was waived on September 2, 2017 and was signed to the practice squad the next day. He was promoted to the active roster on September 16, 2017. He was placed on injured reserve on October 10, 2017.

References

External links

 
 Cal Poly Mustangs bio
 Baltimore Ravens bio

1989 births
Living people
American football cornerbacks
Players of American football from Sacramento, California
Cal Poly Mustangs football players
Baltimore Ravens players
New York Giants players
Cincinnati Bengals players
Arizona Cardinals players
Detroit Lions players
San Francisco 49ers players